Tiān is one of the oldest Chinese terms for heaven and a key concept in Chinese mythology, philosophy, and religion. During the Shang dynasty (17th―11th century BCE), the Chinese referred to their supreme god as Shàngdì ("Lord on High") or Dì ("Lord"). During the following Zhou dynasty, Tiān became synonymous with this figure. Before the 20th century Heaven worship was an orthodox state religion of China.

In Taoism and Confucianism, Tiān (the celestial aspect of the cosmos, often translated as "Heaven") is mentioned in relationship to its complementary aspect of Dì (often translated as "Earth"). They are thought to maintain the two poles of the Three Realms of reality, with the middle realm occupied by Humanity (Rén), and the lower world occupied by demons (魔, Mó) and "ghosts," the damned (鬼, Guǐ).

Characters

The modern Chinese character  and early seal script both combine dà  "great; large" and yī  "one", but some of the original characters in Shāng oracle bone script and Zhōu  bronzeware script anthropomorphically portray a large head on a great person. The ancient oracle and bronze ideograms for dà  depict a stick figure person with arms stretched out denoting "great; large". The oracle and bronze characters for tiān  emphasize the cranium of this "great (person)", either with a square or round head, or head marked with one or two lines. Schuessler notes the bronze graphs for tiān, showing a person with a round head, resemble those for dīng  "4th Celestial stem", and suggests "The anthropomorphic graph may or may not indicate that the original meaning was 'deity', rather than 'sky'."

Pronunciation and etymology
The Modern Standard Chinese pronunciation of  "sky, heaven; heavenly deity, god" is tiān  in level first tone. The character is read as Cantonese tin1; Taiwanese thiN1 or thian1; Vietnamese thiên; Korean cheon or ch'ŏn (천); and Japanese ten in On'yomi (borrowed Chinese reading) and ama- (bound), ame (free), or sora in Kun'yomi (native Japanese reading).

Tiān  reconstructions in Middle Chinese (ca. 6th–10th centuries CE) include t'ien, t'iɛn, tʰɛn > tʰian, and then. Reconstructions in Old Chinese (ca. 6th–3rd centuries BCE) include *t'ien, *t'en, *hlin,  *thîn, and *l̥ˤin.

For the etymology of tiān, Schuessler links it with the Mongolian word tengri "sky, heaven, heavenly deity" or the Tibeto-Burman words taleŋ (Adi) and tǎ-lyaŋ (Lepcha), both meaning "sky". He also suggests a likely connection between Chinese tiān , diān  "summit, mountaintop", and diān  "summit, top of the head, forehead", which have cognates such as Zemeic Naga tiŋ "sky". However, other reconstructions of 天's OC pronunciation *qʰl'iːn  or *l̥ˤi[n]  reconstructed a voiceless lateral onset, either a cluster or a single consonant, respectively. Baxter & Sagart pointed to attested dialectal differences in Eastern Han Chinese, the use of 天 as a phonetic component in phono-semantic compound Chinese characters, and the choice of 天 to transcribe foreign syllables, all of which prompted them to conclude that, around 200 CE, 天's onset had two pronunciations: coronal *tʰ & dorsal *x, both of which likely originated from an earlier voiceless lateral *l̥ˤ.

Compounds
Tiān is one of the components in hundreds of Chinese compounds. Some significant ones include:
Tiānmìng ( "Mandate of Heaven") "divine mandate, God's will; fate, destiny; one's lifespan"
Tiānwèn, the Heavenly Questions section of the Chǔ Cí.
Tiānzĭ ( "Son of Heaven"), an honorific designation for the "Emperor; Chinese sovereign" (Tiānzǐ accounts for 28 of the 140 tiān occurrences in the Shī Jīng above.)
Tiānxià (lit. "all under heaven") "the world, earth; China"
Tiāndì (lit "heaven and earth") "the world; the universe."
Xíngtiān An early mythological hero who fought against Heaven, despite being decapitated.
Tiānfáng Chinese name for Mecca, the Islamic holy city. (Tiān is used as translation of Allah)

Chinese interpretations

Confucius
The concept of Heaven (Tian) is pervasive in Confucianism. Confucius had a deep trust in Heaven and believed that Heaven overruled human efforts. He also believed that he was carrying out the will of Heaven, and that Heaven would not allow its servant, Confucius, to be killed until his work was done.  Many attributes of Heaven were delineated in his Analects.

Confucius honored Heaven as the supreme source of goodness:
The Master said, "Great indeed was Yao as a sovereign! How majestic was he! It is only Heaven that is grand, and only Yao corresponded to it. How vast was his virtue! The people could find no name for it. How majestic was he in the works which he accomplished! How glorious in the elegant regulations which he instituted!"
Confucius felt himself personally dependent upon Heaven: "Wherein I have done improperly, may Heaven reject me! may Heaven reject me!"

Confucius believed that Heaven cannot be deceived:
 The Master being very ill, Zi Lu wished the disciples to act as ministers to him. During a remission of his illness, he said, "Long has the conduct of You been deceitful! By pretending to have ministers when I have them not, whom should I impose upon? Should I impose upon Heaven? Moreover, than that I should die in the hands of ministers, is it not better that I should die in the hands of you, my disciples? And though I may not get a great burial, shall I die upon the road?" 

Confucius believed that Heaven gives people tasks to perform to teach them of virtues and morality:
The Master said, "At fifteen, I had my mind bent on learning. At thirty, I stood firm. At forty, I had no doubts. At fifty, I knew the decrees of Heaven. At sixty, my ear was an obedient organ for the reception of truth. At seventy, I could follow what my heart desired, without transgressing what was right." 

He believed that Heaven knew what he was doing and approved of him, even though none of the rulers on earth might want him as a guide:
The Master said, "Alas! there is no one that knows me." Zi Gong said, "What do you mean by thus saying - that no one knows you?" The Master replied, "I do not murmur against Heaven. I do not grumble against men. My studies lie low, and my penetration rises high. But there is Heaven - that knows me!" 

Perhaps the most remarkable saying, recorded twice, is one in which Confucius expresses complete trust in the overruling providence of Heaven:
The Master was put in fear in Kuang. He said, "After the death of King Wen, was not the cause of truth lodged here in me? If Heaven had wished to let this cause of truth perish, then I, a future mortal, should not have got such a relation to that cause. While Heaven does not let the cause of truth perish, what can the people of Kuang do to me?"

Mozi
For Mozi, Heaven is the divine ruler, just as the Son of Heaven is the earthly ruler. Mozi believed that spirits and minor demons exist or at least rituals should be performed as if they did for social reasons, but their function is to carry out the will of Heaven, watching for evil-doers and punishing them. Mozi taught that Heaven loves all people equally and that each person should similarly love all human beings without distinguishing between his own relatives and those of others. Mozi criticized the Confucians of his own time for not following the teachings of Confucius.  In Mozi's Will of Heaven, he writes:
Moreover, I know Heaven loves men dearly not without reason. Heaven ordered the sun, the moon, and the stars to enlighten and guide them. Heaven ordained the four seasons, Spring, Autumn, Winter, and Summer, to regulate them. Heaven sent down snow, frost, rain, and dew to grow the five grains and flax and silk that so the people could use and enjoy them. Heaven established the hills and rivers, ravines and valleys, and arranged many things to minister to man's good or bring him evil. He appointed the dukes and lords to reward the virtuous and punish the wicked, and to gather metal and wood, birds and beasts, and to engage in cultivating the five grains and flax and silk to provide for the people's food and clothing. This has been so from antiquity to the present."

Schools of cosmology
There are three major schools on cosmology. Most other hypothesis were developed from them.
Gaitian shuo "Canopy-Heavens hypothesis" originated from the text Zhoubi Suanjing. The earth is covered by a material tian.
Huntian shuo "Egg-like hypothesis". The earth surrounded by a tian sphere rotating over it. The celestial bodies are attached to the tian sphere. (See , Chinese creation myth.)
Xuanye shuo "Firmament hypothesis". The tian is an infinite space. The celestial bodies were light matters floating on it moved by Qi. A summary by Ji Meng is in the astronomical chapters of the Book of Jin.

Sometimes the sky is divided into Jiutian "the nine sky divisions", the middle sky and the eight directions.

Buddhism
The Tian are the heaven worlds and pure lands in Buddhist cosmology. Some devas are also called Tian.

Taoism
The number of vertical heaven layers in Taoism is different, the most common saying is the 36 Tian developed from Durenjing.

I-Kuan Tao
In I-Kuan Tao, Tian is divided into three vertical worlds. Li Tian "heaven of truth", Qi Tian "heaven of spirit" and Xiang Tian "heaven of matter".

Meanings
The semantics of tian developed diachronically. The Hanyu dazidian, an historical dictionary of Chinese characters, lists 17 meanings of tian 天, translated below.

 Human forehead; head, cranium. 
 Anciently, to tattoo/brand the forehead as a kind of punishment. 
 The heavens, the sky, the firmament. 
 Celestial bodies; celestial phenomena, meteorological phenomena. 
 Nature, natural. A general reference to objective inevitability beyond human will. 
 Natural, innate; instinctive, inborn. 
 Natural character/quality of a person or thing; natural instinct, inborn nature, disposition. 
 A reference to a particular sky/space. 
 Season; seasons. Like: winter; the three hot 10-day periods [following the summer solstice]. 
 Weather; climate. 
 Day, time of one day and night, or especially the time from sunrise to sunset. Like: today; yesterday; busy all day; go fishing for three days and dry the nets for two [a xiehouyu simile for "unable to finish anything"]. 
 God, heaven, celestial spirit, of the natural world. 
 Heaven, heavenly, a superstitious person's reference to the gods, Buddhas, or immortals; or to the worlds where they live. Like: go to heaven ["die"]; heavenly troops and heavenly generals ["invincible army"]; heavenly goddesses scatter blossoms [a Vimalakirti Sutra reference to "Buddha's arrival"]. 
 Anciently, the king, monarch, sovereign; also referring to elders in human relationships. 
 Object upon which one depends or relies. 
 Dialect. A measure of land [shang, about 15 acres]. 
 A family name, surname. 

The Chinese philosopher Feng Youlan differentiates five different meanings of tian in early Chinese writings: <blockquote>
(1) A material or physical T'ien or sky, that is, the T'ien often spoken of in apposition to earth, as in the common phrase which refers to the physical universe as 'Heaven and Earth' (T'ien Ti ). 
(2) A ruling or presiding T'ien, that is, one such as is meant in the phrase, 'Imperial Heaven Supreme Emperor' (Huang T'ien Shang Ti), in which anthropomorphic T'ien and Ti are signified. 
(3) A fatalistic T'ien, equivalent to the concept of Fate (ming ), a term applied to all those events in human life over which man himself has no control. This is the T'ien Mencius refers to when he says: "As to the accomplishment of a great deed, that is with T'ien" ([Mencius], Ib, 14). 
(4) A naturalistic T'ien, that is, one equivalent to the English word Nature. This is the sort of T'ien described in the 'Discussion on T'ien''' in the [Hsün Tzǔ] (ch. 17). 
(5) An ethical T'ien, that is, one having a moral principle and which is the highest primordial principle of the universe. This is the sort of T'ien which the [Chung Yung] (Doctrine of the Mean) refers to in its opening sentence when it says: "What T'ien confers (on man) is called his nature." </blockquote>

The Oxford English Dictionary enters the English loanword t'ien (also tayn, tyen, tien, and tiān) "Chinese thought: Heaven; the Deity." The earliest recorded usages for these spelling variants are: 1613 Tayn, 1710 Tien, 1747 Tyen, and 1878 T'ien.

Interpretation by Western Sinologists
The sinologist Herrlee Creel, who wrote a comprehensive study called "The Origin of the Deity T'ien", gives this overview.

Creel refers to the historical shift in ancient Chinese names for "god"; from Shang oracles that frequently used di and shangdi and rarely used tian to Zhou bronzes and texts that used tian more frequently than its synonym shangdi.

First, Creel analyzes all the tian and di occurrences meaning "god; gods" in Western Zhou era Chinese classic texts and bronze inscriptions. The Yi Jing "Classic of Changes" has 2 tian and 1 di; the Shi Jing "Classic of Poetry" has 140 tian and 43 di or shangdi; and the authentic portions of the Shu Jing "Classic of Documents" have 116 tian and 25 di or shangdi. His corpus of authenticated Western Zhou bronzes mention tian 91 times and di or shangdi only 4 times. Second, Creel contrasts the disparity between 175 occurrences of di or shangdi on Shang era oracle inscriptions with "at least" 26 occurrences of tian. Upon examining these 26 oracle scripts that scholars (like Guo Moruo) have identified as tian  "heaven; god", he rules out 8 cases in fragments where the contextual meaning is unclear. Of the remaining 18, Creel interprets 11 cases as graphic variants for da "great; large; big" (e.g., tian i shang  for da i shang  "great settlement Shang"), 3 as a place name, and 4 cases of oracles recording sacrifices yu tian  "to/at Tian" (which could mean "to Heaven/God" or "at a place called Tian".)

The Shu Jing chapter "Tang Shi" ( "Tang's Speech") illustrates how early Zhou texts used tian "heaven; god" in contexts with shangdi "god".  According to tradition, Tang of Shang assembled his subjects to overthrow King Jie of Xia, the infamous last ruler of the Xia Dynasty, but they were reluctant to attack.

Having established that Tian was not a deity of the Shang people, Creel proposes a hypothesis for how it originated. Both the Shang and Zhou peoples pictographically represented da  as "a large or great man". The Zhou subsequently added a head on him to denote tian  meaning "king, kings" (cf. wang  "king; ruler", which had oracle graphs picturing a line under a "great person" and bronze graphs that added the top line). From "kings", tian was semantically extended to mean "dead kings; ancestral kings", who controlled "fate; providence", and ultimately a single omnipotent deity Tian "Heaven". In addition, tian named both "the heavens" (where ancestral kings and gods supposedly lived) and the visible "sky".

Another possibility is that Tian may be related to Tengri and possibly was a loan word from a prehistoric Central Asian language.

See also
 Amenominakanushi (天御中主), the Japanese concept of God as the ultimate creator
 Haneullim, the Sky God of Cheondoism 
 Hongjun Laozu
 Names of God in China
 Shangdi 
 Shen 
 Taiyi Tianzun
 Tengri, the Turkic-Mongolic sky God

Tian related terms
 Tian Xia (All under Heaven)
 Tian Chao (Dynasty of Heaven)
 Tian Kehan (Khan of Heaven)
 Tian Ming (Mandate of Heaven)
 Tian Zi (Son of Heaven)
 Tiandihui (Heaven and Earth Society)
 Tiandiism (Heavenly Deity religion)
 Tianzhu (Chinese Rites controversy'')

References

Citations

Sources 

 
  Supplemental materials available at their webpage.

External links

Oracle, Bronze, and Seal characters for 天, Richard Sears

Chinese deities
Chinese gods
Locations in Chinese mythology
Conceptions of God
Religious Confucianism
East Asian traditional religion
Heaven
Names of God
Sky and weather gods
Taoist cosmology
God
Relationship between Heaven and Mankind